The Government of the United Kingdom maintains several intelligence agencies that deal with secret intelligence. These agencies are responsible for collecting, analysing and exploiting foreign and domestic intelligence, providing military intelligence, and performing espionage and counter-espionage. Their intelligence assessments contribute to the conduct of the foreign relations of the United Kingdom, maintaining the national security of the United Kingdom, military planning, public safety, and law enforcement in the United Kingdom. The four main agencies are the Secret Intelligence Service (SIS or MI6), the Security Service (MI5), the Government Communications Headquarters (GCHQ) and Defence Intelligence (DI). The agencies are organised under three government departments, the Foreign Office, the Home Office and the Ministry of Defence.

The history of the organisations dates back to the 19th century. The decryption of the Zimmermann Telegram in 1917 was described as the most significant intelligence triumph for Britain during World War I, and one of the earliest occasions on which a piece of signals intelligence influenced world events. During the Second World War and afterwards, many observers regarded Ultra signals intelligence as immensely valuable to the Allies of World War II. In 1962, during the Cuban Missile Crisis, GCHQ interceptions of Soviet ship positions were sent directly to the White House. Intelligence cooperation in the post-war period between the United Kingdom and the United States became the cornerstone of Western intelligence gathering and the "Special Relationship" between the United Kingdom and the United States.

National security community

Committees 

 National Security Council
 Joint Intelligence Committee

Coordination, analysis, and advice 
The National Security Secretariat and the Joint Intelligence Organisation are part of Cabinet Office. They support the National Security Council and the Joint Intelligence Committee by providing coordination on strategic issues, all-source intelligence analysis, and policy advice to the Prime Minister and other senior ministers.

Oversight 

 Intelligence and Security Committee of Parliament
 Investigatory Powers Tribunal
 Investigatory Powers Commissioner
 Independent Reviewer of Terrorism Legislation

Agencies

History

Origins 
Organised intelligence collection and planning for the government of the United Kingdom and the British Empire was established during the 19th century. The War Office, responsible for the administration of the British Army, formed the Intelligence Branch in 1873, which became the Directorate of Military Intelligence. The Admiralty, responsible for the command of the Royal Navy, formed the Foreign Intelligence Committee in 1882, which evolved into the Naval Intelligence Department (NID) in 1887. 

The Committee of Imperial Defence, established in 1902, was responsible for research, and some co-ordination, on issues of military strategy.

First World War 

The Secret Service Bureau was founded in 1909 as a joint initiative of the Admiralty and the War Office to control secret intelligence operations in the UK and overseas, particularly concentrating on the activities of the Imperial German government. The Bureau was split into naval and army sections which, over time, specialised in foreign espionage and internal counter-espionage activities respectively. This specialisation, formalised prior to 1914, was a result of the Admiralty intelligence requirements related to the maritime strength of the Imperial German Navy. In 1916, during the First World War, the two sections underwent administrative changes so that the internal counter-espionage section became the Directorate of Military Intelligence Section 5 (MI5) and the foreign section became the Directorate of Military Intelligence Section 6 (MI6), names by which the Security Service and Secret Intelligence Service are commonly known today.

The Naval Intelligence Division led the Royal Navy's highly successful cryptographic efforts, Room 40 (later known as NID25). The decryption of the Zimmermann Telegram was described as the most significant intelligence triumph for Britain during World War I, and one of the earliest occasions on which a piece of signals intelligence influenced world events.

The Imperial War Cabinet was the British Empire's wartime coordinating body.

Interwar 
In 1919, the Cabinet's Secret Service Committee, recommended that a peacetime codebreaking agency should be created. Staff were merged from NID25 and MI1b into the new organisation, which was given the cover-name the "Government Code and Cypher School" (GC&CS).

The Joint Intelligence Committee (JIC) was founded in 1936 as a sub-committee of the Committee of Imperial Defence.

Second World War 
Following the outbreak of the Second World War in 1939, the JIC became the senior intelligence assessment body for the United Kingdom government.

During the War, the RAF Intelligence Branch was established, although personnel had been employed in intelligence duties in the RAF since its formation in 1918.

The Special Operations Executive (SOE) was operational from 1940 until early 1946. SOE conducted espionage, sabotage and reconnaissance in occupied Europe and later in occupied Southeast Asia against the Axis powers and aided local resistance movements.

The GC&CS was based largely at Bletchley Park. Its staff, including Alan Turing, worked on cryptanalysis of the Enigma (codenamed Ultra) and Lorenz cipher, and also a large number of other enemy systems. Winston Churchill was reported to have told King George VI, when presenting to him Stewart Menzies (head of the Secret Intelligence Service and the person who controlled distribution of Ultra decrypts to the government): "It is thanks to the secret weapon of General Menzies, put into use on all the fronts, that we won the war!" F. W. Winterbotham quoted the western Supreme Allied Commander, Dwight D. Eisenhower, at war's end describing Ultra as having been "decisive" to Allied victory. Sir Harry Hinsley, Bletchley Park veteran and official historian of British Intelligence in World War II, made a similar assessment about Ultra, saying that it shortened the war "by not less than two years and probably by four years"; and that, in the absence of Ultra, it is uncertain how the war would have ended.

Cold War 
The Government Code and Cypher School was renamed the "Government Communications Headquarters" (GCHQ) in 1946. 

Wartime signals intelligence cooperation between the United Kingdom and the United States continued in the post-war period. The two countries signed the bilateral UKUSA Agreement in 1948. It was later broadened to include Canada, Australia and New Zealand, known as the Five Eyes, as well as cooperation with several "third-party" nations. This became the cornerstone of Western intelligence gathering and the "Special Relationship" between the UK and the USA. Since World War II, the chief of the London station of the United States Central Intelligence Agency has attended the Joint Intelligence Committee's weekly meetings. One former US intelligence officer has described this as the "highlight of the job" for the London CIA chief. Resident intelligence chiefs from Australia, Canada, and New Zealand may attend when certain issues are discussed.

In 1946 the Joint Intelligence Bureau (JIB) was established. The JIB was structured into a series of divisions: procurement (JIB 1), geographic (JIB 2 and JIB 3), defences, ports and beaches (JIB 4), airfields (JIB 5), key points (JIB 6), oil (JIB 7) and telecommunications (JIB 8).

The Joint Intelligence Committee moved to the Cabinet Office in 1957 with its assessments staff who prepared intelligence assessments for the committee to consider.

During the Cuban Missile Crisis, GCHQ Scarborough intercepted radio communications from Soviet ships reporting their positions and used that to establish where they were heading. A copy of the report was sent directly to the White House Situation Room, providing initial indications of Soviet intentions with regards the US naval blockade of Cuba.

When the Ministry of Defence was formed in 1964, the Joint Intelligence Bureau, Naval Intelligence, Military Intelligence and Air Intelligence were combined to form the Defence Intelligence Staff (DIS). The DIS focussed initially on Cold War issues.

In 1973, Clifford Cocks invented a public-key cryptography algorithm equivalent to what would become (in 1978) the RSA algorithm while working at GCHQ.

The Security Service Act 1989 established the legal basis of the Security Service (MI5) for the first time under the government led by Margaret Thatcher. GCHQ and the Secret Intelligence Service (MI6) were placed on a statutory footing by the Intelligence Services Act 1994 under the government led by John Major.

21st century 
The Defence Intelligence Staff changed its name to Defence Intelligence (DI) in 2009. The Joint Intelligence Organisation was formalised to provide intelligence assessment and advice on development of the UK intelligence community's analytical capability for the Joint Intelligence Committee and the National Security Council, which was established in 2010.

The National Crime Agency, established in 2013, gathers and analyses intelligence on serious and organised crime. It was preceded by the National Drugs Intelligence Unit (1970s–1992), National Criminal Intelligence Service (1992–2006), and the Serious Organised Crime Agency (2006–2013).

Five other organisations which collect and analyse domestic intelligence within specific fields were formed under the authority of the Home Office: the National Domestic Extremism and Disorder Intelligence Unit, which dates back to 2004 and has been hosted by the Metropolitan Police Service since 2011; the Gangmasters and Labour Abuse Authority which was formed in 2005; the Office for Security and Counter-Terrorism, created in 2007, which is responsible for leading work on counter-terrorism working closely with the police and security services; the National Ballistics Intelligence Service, which was created in 2008; and the National Fraud Intelligence Bureau, which was established in 2010 by the City of London Police.

The Centre for the Protection of National Infrastructure (CPNI) was formed as a child agency of MI5 in 2007. It merged two predecessor bodies, the National Infrastructure Security Co-ordination Centre (1999–2007) and the National Security Advice Centre. In 2016, the cybersecurity-related aspects of the CPNI's role were taken over by the newly-formed National Cyber Security Centre (NCSC), itself a child agency of GCHQ.

Budget

Single Intelligence Account
The Single Intelligence Account (SIA) is the funding vehicle for the three main security and intelligence agencies: the Secret Intelligence Service (SIS/MI6), Government Communications Headquarters (GCHQ) and the Security Service (MI5). Spending on the SIA was £3.2 billion in financial year 2017/18.

Defence Intelligence 
Defence Intelligence has a unique position within the UK intelligence community as an 'all-source' intelligence function. It is integral part of the Ministry of Defence (MoD) and is funded within the UK's defence budget.

Other agencies 
The domestic intelligence and security organisations, including joint police units, described in the sections above are funded by the Home Office.

See also
 Club de Berne
 Information Research Department
 Intelligence Corps (United Kingdom)
 List of intelligence agencies global list sorted by country
 Mass surveillance in the United Kingdom
 UK cyber security community

References

Citations

Bibliography

 Transcript of a lecture given on Tuesday 19 October 1993 at Cambridge University

 The first published account of the previously secret wartime operation, concentrating  mainly on distribution of intelligence. It was written from memory and has been shown by subsequent authors, who had access to official records, to contain some inaccuracies.

 
United Kingdom
United Kingdom
Government agencies of the United Kingdom
 
Espionage in the United Kingdom